The 6th Blockbuster Entertainment Awards were held on May 9, 2000 at the Shrine Auditorium in Los Angeles. They were the first Blockbuster Entertainment Awards to present awards for video games in addition to music and film.

Below is a complete list of nominees and winners. Winners are highlighted in bold.

Film

Favorite Actress - Drama
 Cameron Diaz in Any Given Sunday
  Annette Bening in American Beauty
 Winona Ryder in Girl, Interrupted

Favorite Actor - Drama
 Tom Hanks in The Green Mile
 Al Pacino in Any Given Sunday
 Kevin Spacey in American Beauty
 Denzel Washington in The Hurricane

Favorite Actress - Drama/Romance
 Nicole Kidman in Eyes Wide Shut
 Robin Wright Penn in Message in a Bottle
 Rene Russo in The Thomas Crown Affair

Favorite Actor - Drama/Romance
 Pierce Brosnan in The Thomas Crown Affair
 Kevin Costner in Message in a Bottle
 Tom Cruise in Eyes Wide Shut

Favorite Actress - Comedy/Romance
 Drew Barrymore in Never Been Kissed
 Sandra Bullock in Forces of Nature
 Julia Roberts in Runaway Bride and Notting Hill

Favorite Actor - Comedy/Romance
 Ben Affleck in Forces of Nature
 Richard Gere in Runaway Bride
 Hugh Grant in Notting Hill
 Freddie Prinze, Jr. in She's All That

Favorite Actress - Comedy
 Heather Graham in Austin Powers: The Spy Who Shagged Me and Bowfinger
 Embeth Davidtz in Bicentennial Man
 Molly Shannon in Superstar
 Sigourney Weaver in Galaxy Quest

Favorite Actor - Comedy
 Adam Sandler in Big Daddy
 Tim Allen in Galaxy Quest
 Mike Myers in Austin Powers: The Spy Who Shagged Me
 Rob Schneider in Deuce Bigalow: Male Gigolo
 Robin Williams in Bicentennial Man

Favorite Comedy Team
 Robert De Niro and Billy Crystal in Analyze This
 Steve Martin and Eddie Murphy in Bowfinger
 Eddie Murphy and Martin Lawrence in Life

Favorite Actress - Action
 Catherine Zeta-Jones in Entrapment
 Natalie Portman in Star Wars: Episode I – The Phantom Menace
 Denise Richards in The World Is Not Enough
 Rachel Weisz in The Mummy

Favorite Actor - Action
 Pierce Brosnan in The World Is Not Enough
 Sean Connery in Entrapment
 Brendan Fraser in The Mummy
 Mel Gibson in Payback

Favorite Action Team
 Mark Wahlberg, George Clooney and Ice Cube in Three Kings
 Brad Pitt and Edward Norton in Fight Club
 Will Smith and Kevin Kline in Wild Wild West

Favorite Actor - Action/Science Fiction
 Keanu Reeves in The Matrix
 Ewan McGregor in Star Wars: Episode I – The Phantom Menace
 Liam Neeson in Star Wars: Episode I – The Phantom Menace
 Arnold Schwarzenegger in End of Days

Favorite Actress - Suspense
 Ashley Judd in Double Jeopardy
 Angelina Jolie in The Bone Collector
 Gwyneth Paltrow in The Talented Mr. Ripley

Favorite Actor - Suspense
 Bruce Willis in The Sixth Sense
 Matt Damon in The Talented Mr. Ripley
 Tommy Lee Jones in Double Jeopardy
 John Travolta in The General's Daughter

Favorite Actress - Horror
 Christina Ricci in Sleepy Hollow
 Patricia Arquette in Stigmata
 Catherine Zeta-Jones in The Haunting

Favorite Actor - Horror
 Johnny Depp in  Sleepy Hollow
 Gabriel Byrne in Stigmata
 Liam Neeson in The Haunting

Favorite Supporting Actress - Action
 Salma Hayek in Wild Wild West
 Pernilla August in Star Wars: Episode I – The Phantom Menace
 Sophie Marceau in The World Is Not Enough

Favorite Supporting Actor - Action
 LL Cool J in Deep Blue Sea
 John Hannah in The Mummy
 Ving Rhames in Entrapment

Favorite Villain
 Mike Myers as "Dr. Evil" in Austin Powers: The Spy Who Shagged Me
 Kenneth Branagh as "Dr. Loveless" in Wild Wild West
 Ray Park as "Darth Maul" in Star Wars: Episode I – The Phantom Menace
 Arnold Vosloo as "The Mummy" in The Mummy
 Hugo Weaving as "Agent Smith" in The Matrix

Favorite Supporting Actress - Horror
 Miranda Richardson in Sleepy Hollow
 Famke Janssen in House on Haunted Hill
 Lili Taylor in The Haunting

Favorite Supporting Actor - Horror
 Taye Diggs in House on Haunted Hill
 Marc Pickering in Sleepy Hollow
 Jonathan Pryce in Stigmata
 Owen Wilson in The Haunting

Favorite Supporting Actor - Action/Science-Fiction
 Laurence Fishburne in The Matrix
 Jake Lloyd in Star Wars: Episode I – The Phantom Menace
 Kevin Pollak in End of Days

Favorite Supporting Actress - Comedy
 Lisa Kudrow in Analyze This
 Joey Lauren Adams in Big Daddy
 Mindy Sterling in Austin Powers: The Spy Who Shagged Me

Favorite Supporting Actor - Comedy
 Eugene Levy in American Pie
 Dylan and Cole Sprouse in Big Daddy
 Verne Troyer in Austin Powers: The Spy Who Shagged Me

Favorite Supporting Actress - Comedy/Romance
 Joan Cusack in Runaway Bride
 Emma Chambers in Notting Hill
 Maura Tierney in Forces of Nature

Favorite Supporting Actor - Comedy/Romance
 David Arquette in Never Been Kissed
 Rhys Ifans in Notting Hill
 Steve Zahn in Forces of Nature

Favorite Supporting Actress - Drama
 Angelina Jolie in Girl, Interrupted
 Thora Birch in American Beauty
 Bonnie Hunt in The Green Mile
 Julianne Moore in Magnolia

Favorite Supporting Actor - Drama
 Tom Cruise in Magnolia
 Wes Bentley in American Beauty
 Michael Clarke Duncan in The Green Mile
 Jamie Foxx in Any Given Sunday

Favorite Supporting Actress - Drama/Romance
 Reese Witherspoon in Cruel Intentions
 Illeana Douglas in Message in a Bottle
 Jena Malone in For Love of the Game

Favorite Supporting Actor - Drama/Romance
 Denis Leary in The Thomas Crown Affair
 Paul Newman in Message in a Bottle
 Sydney Pollack in Eyes Wide Shut

Favorite Supporting Actress - Suspense
 Toni Collette in The Sixth Sense
 Cate Blanchett in The Talented Mr. Ripley
 Madeleine Stowe in The General's Daughter

Favorite Supporting Actor - Suspense
 Jude Law in The Talented Mr. Ripley
 James Cromwell in The General's Daughter
 Bruce Greenwood in Double Jeopardy

Favorite Actress - Newcomer
 Rachael Leigh Cook in She's All That
 Saffron Burrows in Deep Blue Sea
 Heather Donahue in The Blair Witch Project
 Carrie-Anne Moss in The Matrix
 Mena Suvari in American Pie and American Beauty

Favorite Actor - Newcomer
 Haley Joel Osment in The Sixth Sense
 Jason Biggs in American Pie
 Joshua Leonard in The Blair Witch Project
 Michael Williams in The Blair Witch Project
 James Van Der Beek in Varsity Blues

Family Favorite Film
 Toy Story 2
 Inspector Gadget
 Pokémon: The First Movie
 Stuart Little
 Tarzan

Music

Favorite Female Artist - Pop
 Cher: Believe
 Celine Dion: All the Way ... A Decade of Song
 Sarah McLachlan: Mirrorball

Favorite Male Artist - Pop
 Ricky Martin: Ricky Martin
 Andrea Bocelli: Sogno
 Sting: Brand New Day

Favorite Group - Pop
 Backstreet Boys: Millennium
 98 Degrees: 98 Degrees and Rising
 'N Sync: 'N Sync

Favorite Artist - Rap
 Dr. Dre: Dr. Dre 2001
 Jay-Z: Vol. 2 ... Hard Knock Life
 Juvenile: 400 Degreez

Favorite Duo or Group - Country
 Dixie Chicks: Wide Open Spaces and Fly
 Brooks & Dunn: Greatest Hits Collection
 Lonestar: Lonely Grill

Favorite Male Artist - Country
 Garth Brooks: Double Live and Magic of Christmas
 Tim McGraw: A Place in the Sun
 George Strait: Always Never the Same

Favorite Female Artist - Country
 Shania Twain: Come On Over
 Faith Hill: Breathe & Faith
 Jo Dee Messina: I'm Alright

Favorite Male Artist - R&B
 Brian McKnight: Back at One
 Ginuwine: 100% Ginuwine
 R. Kelly: R.

Favorite Female Artist - R&B
 Mariah Carey: Rainbow
 Lauryn Hill: Miseducation of Lauryn Hill
 Whitney Houston: My Love is Your Love

Favorite Group - R&B
 TLC: Fanmail
 112: Room 112
 Destiny's Child: The Writing's On The Wall

Favorite Artist - Modern Rock
 Kid Rock: Devil Without a Cause
 Everlast: Whitey Ford Sings the Blues
 Lenny Kravitz: 5

Favorite Group - Modern Rock
 Limp Bizkit: Significant Other
 The Offspring: Americana
 Smash Mouth: Astro Lounge

Favorite Male - New Artist
 Eminem: The Slim Shady LP
 Marc Anthony: Marc Anthony
 Lou Bega: A Little Bit of Mambo

Favorite Female - New Artist
 Christina Aguilera: Christina Aguilera
 Jennifer Lopez: On the 6
 Britney Spears: Baby One More Time

Favorite Group - New Artist
 Blink-182: Enema of the State
 B*witched: Bewitched
 Lit: A Place in the Sun

Favorite Latino Artist
 Enrique Iglesias: Bailamos
 Elvis Crespo: Suavemente
 Selena: All My Hits - Todos Mis Exitos

Favorite Artist or Group - Rock
 Carlos Santana: Supernatural
 Jimmy Buffett: Beach House On The Moon
 Phil Collins: Hits

Favorite Latino Group
 Maná: MTV Unplugged
 Gipsy Kings: Best of Gipsy Kings
 Los Tigres Del Norte: Herencia de Familia
 Los Tri-O: Nuestro Amor

Favorite CD
 Backstreet Boys: Millennium
 Limp Bizkit: Significant Other
 Ricky Martin: Ricky Martin
 Britney Spears: Baby One More Time
 Shania Twain: Come On Over

Favorite Single
 Christina Aguilera: "Genie in a Bottle"
 Cher: "Believe"
 Whitney Houston: "Heartbreak Hotel"

Favorite Soundtrack
 Austin Powers: The Spy Who Shagged Me
 Tarzan
 Wild Wild West

Favorite Song from a Movie
 "Music of My Heart" by Gloria Estefan featuring 'N Sync from Music of the Heart
 "When You Believe" by Mariah Carey and Whitney Houston from The Prince of Egypt
 "Bailamos" by Enrique Iglesias from Wild Wild West
 "Fortunate" by Maxwell from Life
 "Wild Wild West" by Will Smith from Wild Wild West

Favorite Artist - Comedy
 Adam Sandler: Stan & Judy's Kid
 Chris Rock: Bigger & Blacker
 Weird Al Yankovic: Running With Scissors

Video games

Favorite Video Game
 Super Smash Bros.
 Army Men: Sarge's Heroes
 Driver: You Are The Wheelman
 Resident Evil 3: Nemesis
 Pokémon Yellow

Favorite Playstation Game
 Tony Hawk's Pro Skater
 Driver: You Are The Wheelman
 Gran Turismo 2
 Resident Evil 3: Nemesis
 Syphon Filter
 Tomorrow Never Dies

Favorite Nintendo 64 Game
 Donkey Kong 64
 Army Men: Sarge's Heroes
 Mario Party
 Pokémon Snap
 Star Wars Episode I: Racer
 Super Smash Bros.

Favorite Game Boy Game
 Super Mario Bros. Deluxe
 Pokémon Blue
 Pokémon Pinball
 Pokémon Red
 Pokémon Yellow
 Toy Story 2: Buzz Lightyear to the Rescue

Favorite Dreamcast Game
 Sonic Adventure
 NBA 2K
 NFL 2K
 Ready 2 Rumble Boxing
 Sega Bass Fishing
 Soul Calibur

References

 All nominees: 
 All winners: 
 Music winners: 
 

2000 awards in the United States
2000 film awards
2000 in California
2000 in Los Angeles
Blockbuster LLC